"Nettiin" is a Finnish-language song by Finnish singer Jenni Vartiainen, released from her second studio album Seili by Warner Music on 17 July 2010. The song is written by Teemu Brunila. The release includes the song, its remix and a remix of her previous single, "En haluu kuolla tänä yönä".

Chart performance
The song stayed in the Finnish Singles Chart for a total of 11 weeks peaking at number 13 on week 29, in July 2010.

Track listing

Charts

References

External links
 

2010 singles
Jenni Vartiainen songs
Finnish-language songs
Songs written by Teemu Brunila
Warner Music Finland singles
2010 songs